Kim Dexter Hendren (born February 6, 1938) is an American engineer and politician. He served as a Democratic and Republican member for the 6th and 9th districts of the Arkansas Senate. Hendren also served a member of the 1st and 92nd districts of the Arkansas House of Representatives.

Hendren was born in Gravette, Arkansas, and attended Gravette High School. He then attended at the University of Arkansas, where he earned a Bachelor of Science degree in industrial engineering in 1960. Hendren worked as an engineer. He established and owned the company Hendren Plastics Inc. He was also a colonel in the Arkansas Air National Guard.

In 1979 Hendren was elected for the 6th district of the Arkansas Senate, serving until 1983. In 2001, he was elected for the 1st district of the Arkansas House of Representatives, succeeding his son Jim. He was then a Republican politician. 

In 2003, Hendren was elected for the 9th district of the Arkansas Senate, where he served until 2013. In 2015, he was elected for the 92nd district of the Arkansas House of Representatives. In 2019, he was succeeded by his daughter Gayla.

In his career, Hendren had served as the minority leader of the Arkansas Senate.

References 

1938 births
Living people
People from Gravette, Arkansas
Arkansas state senators
Members of the Arkansas House of Representatives
Arkansas Democrats
Arkansas Republicans
20th-century American politicians
21st-century American politicians
University of Arkansas alumni
American engineers
20th-century American engineers
Hutchinson family
Businesspeople from Arkansas